Malfejan Rural District is a rural district (dehestan) in the Central District of Siahkal County, Gilan Province, Iran. At the 2006 census, its population was 6,390, in 1,893 families. The rural district has 37 villages.

References 

Rural Districts of Gilan Province
Siahkal County